Eloise: The Animated Series or Me, Eloise! is an American children's animated comedy television series, based on the Eloise series of children's books drawn and written by Kay Thompson and Hilary Knight. This series features the voices of Mary Matilyn Mouser as Eloise, Lynn Redgrave as the Nanny, and Tim Curry as Mr. Salamone. The television series was produced by Starz Media and HandMade Films, and aired on Starz Kids & Family from October to November 2006. 13 episodes were produced.

Plot
The show follows Eloise as she attends movie productions, dates, Christmas parties, birthday parties and violin recitals while taking on adventures along with her friends.

Episode list

Cast

Characters with unknown voice actors
Corky
Debbie and Ell Lincoln
Diego
Elevator Man (when he sings in Christmas episode)
Eloise`s mother (appears at end of Christmas episode)
False Doctor
Matteus
Monte
Taylor

Recurring roles
Identified:
Mary Mouser - Eloise
Lynn Redgrave - Nanny
Tim Curry - Mr. Salamone
Jeff Bennett - Charlie the doorman
Kathleen Gati - Mrs. Thornton
Rob Paulsen - Bill
Candi Milo - Margarita, Betty, Bobby and Bruce
Tara Strong - Nicole in "Eloise in Springtime", Edwin
Phil LaMarr - Tyler
Lauren Tom - Noelle in "Eloise Goes to School"
Dionne Quan - Yuko Takahashi
April Winchell - Betty's mother, secretary and Janet Palmer in "Eloise Goes to Hollywood", three tutor candidates in "Eloise Goes to School"
Neil Patrick Harris - Philip, Eloise's boarding school teacher

Uncredited:

One-shot roles
Identified:
Doris Roberts - Teacher in "Eloise Goes to School"
Brad Garrett - Diamond Jim Johnson in the Halloween episode
James Belushi - as himself, in the Halloween episode
Clyde Kusatsu as Mr. Takahashi, Yuko`s father in the Christmas episode
Matthew Lillard - Monsieur Ducat in the Christmas episode

Uncredited:
 Curtis Armstrong - character in episode 1
 Henry Gibson - character in "Eloise Goes to School"
 Tony Jay - character in "Eloise in Springtime"

Additional voices
Voices in Eloise Goes to Hollywood:
Alan Cumming - 
Cynthia Nixon - 
Jason Marsden -
Kevin Michael Richardson
Lacey Chabert - 
Liliana Mumy -
Nestor Carbonell -
Jane Lynch

Crew
 Charlie Adler - Casting and Voice Director
 Wes Archer - Creative Director

DVD releases
 It's Me, Eloise (October 10, 2006)
 Little Miss Christmas (October 10, 2006)
 Eloise in Hollywood (March 13, 2007)
 Eloise Goes to School (July 24, 2007)
 Eloise in Springtime (February 26, 2008)
 Eloise's Rawther Unusual Halloween (September 2, 2008)

References

External links 

 
 
 

2000s American animated television series
2000s American children's comedy television series
2006 American television series debuts
2006 American television series endings
American children's animated comedy television series
American television shows based on children's books
Animated television series about children
English-language television shows
Starz original programming
Television series set in the 1950s
Television series by Film Roman
Television shows set in Oregon
Television series by Lionsgate Television